The 2006 Elections in Washington include races for the US Senate, US House and Washington State Legislature.  This page tracks incumbents and challengers for the Washington State Senate.

Summary of results

Before the 2006 elections, Democrats held 26 of 49 seats in the state Senate, a 1 vote majority. Democrats successfully flipped five seats while Republicans flipped one, bringing the Democratic majority to 30 out of 49 seats.

Results

District 38
Jean Berkey (D) - Incumbent

Jean Berkey was elected in 2002 into House Seat #2, and took the Senator position when Aaron Reardon took the position of Snohomish County Executive. Aaron was challenged by Glenn Coggeshell in 2002, and received 65.34% of the vote.

District 42
Dale E. Brandland (R) - Incumbent
Jesse M. Salomon (D) - Challenger
Website: http://jessesalomonforstatesenate.blogspot.com/

Dale Brandland was challenged by Georgia Gardner (D), Peter Tassoni (G) and Donald Crawford (L) in 2002, and received 49.25% of the vote.

District 43
Pat Thibaudeau (D) - Incumbent, stepping down
Rep. Ed Murray (D)
Ed Murray for State Senate
Loren Nelson (R)

Ed Murray has served the 43rd district since 1995 in the Washington State House of Representatives.

Pat Thibaudeau was challenged by Linde Knighton (G) in 2002, and received 79.04% of the vote. She announced her retirement from the Senate in May 2006, after Murray had declared his intention to challenge her for the Democratic nomination.

District 44
Dave Schmidt (R) - Incumbent
Steve Hobbs (D) - Challenger
Website: http://www.electhobbs.com/
Lillian Kaufer (D) - Challenger
Website: https://web.archive.org/web/20060626071857/http://www.lillianforsenate.com/

David Schmidt was challenged by Phil Doerflein (D) in 2002 and received 53.09% of the vote.

District 45
Toby Nixon (R)
Website: http://www.tobynixon.com/
Eric Oemig (D)
Website: https://web.archive.org/web/20151106032436/http://www.voteeric.com/

Incumbent Sen. Bill Finkbeiner has decided to step down, citing personal reasons.  Rep. Toby Nixon has declared for the seat, leaving his House seat open.

District 46
Ken Jacobsen (D) - Incumbent
Brian Travis (R)
Ken Jacobsen was unchallenged in 2002.

District 47
Mike Riley (R)
Website: https://web.archive.org/web/20060822040045/http://www.riley4senate.com/
Ed Crawford (D)
Website: https://web.archive.org/web/20060627130145/http://www.edcrawfordforsenate.com/
Claudia Kauffman (D)
Website: https://web.archive.org/web/20061008105722/http://www.claudiaforsenate.com/

Stephen Johnson was challenged by Deborah Jacobson in 2002, and received 55.52% of the vote.   Johnson has decided to run for Washington State Supreme Court in 2006, making this an open seat.

Steve Reichert was previously running for the Republican nomination, but withdrew due to an "old injury that has flared up".

Ed Crawford recently retired as chief of the city of Kent Police Department.

District 48
Luke Esser (R) - Incumbent
Rodney Tom (D) - Challenger
Rodney Tom is a 2 term Republican from the House in the 48th.  On March 14, he announced that he would be seeking the Senate seat as a Democrat, asking challenger Debi Golden (www.debigolden.com) to step aside to avoid a primary election.

References

Senate
Washington State Senate elections
Washington Senate